The 1958 All-Ireland Minor Hurling Championship was the 28th staging of the All-Ireland Minor Hurling Championship since its establishment by the Gaelic Athletic Association in 1928. The championship began on 6 April 1958 and ended on 7 September 1958.

Tipperary entered the championship as the defending champions in search of a fourth successive title, however, they were beaten by Limerick in the Munster quarter-final.

On 7 September 1958 Limerick won the championship following a 5-8 to 3-10 defeat of Galway in the All-Ireland final. This was their second All-Ireland title and their first in 15 championship seasons.

Results

Connacht Minor Hurling Championship

Leinster Minor Hurling Championship

Munster Minor Hurling Championship

Ulster Minor Hurling Championship

All-Ireland Minor Hurling Championship

External links
 All-Ireland Minor Hurling Championship: Roll Of Honour

Minor
All-Ireland Minor Hurling Championship